George Peirce may refer to:

 George James Peirce (1868–1954), American botanist
 George W. Peirce (1846–1938), American businessman

See also
 George Pierce (disambiguation)
 George Pearce (disambiguation)
 George Pearse (disambiguation)